Gautieria inapire is a species of hypogeal fungus in the family Gomphaceae.

Gomphaceae